Jörg Hoffmann (born 29 January 1970) is a former freestyle swimmer from Germany, who won the bronze medal in the 1500 m freestyle at the 1992 Summer Olympics in Barcelona, Spain. He competed in three consecutive Summer Olympics, starting in Seoul 1988 as a member of the East German team.

Hoffmann was born in Schwedt an der Oder. A long distance specialist, he won the European title in the 1500 m freestyle four times in a row; the first one came in 1989 in Bonn, the last one in 1995 in Vienna.

See also
 List of German records in swimming
 World record progression 1500 metres freestyle

External links

 Jörg Hoffmann on FINA-website
 

1970 births
Living people
Sportspeople from Schwedt
People from Bezirk Frankfurt
German male swimmers
Olympic swimmers of East Germany
German male freestyle swimmers
Olympic swimmers of Germany
Swimmers at the 1988 Summer Olympics
Swimmers at the 1992 Summer Olympics
Swimmers at the 1996 Summer Olympics
World record setters in swimming
Olympic bronze medalists in swimming
World Aquatics Championships medalists in swimming
Medalists at the FINA World Swimming Championships (25 m)
European Aquatics Championships medalists in swimming
Medalists at the 1992 Summer Olympics
Olympic bronze medalists for Germany
20th-century German people
21st-century German people